

Universities

Engineering institutions 

Autonomous Institutions
 National Institute of Technology, Hamirpur
 Indian Institute of Technology Mandi, Mandi
 Indian Institute of Information Technology Una

Govt university departments
 University Institute of Information Technology, Himachal Pradesh University, Shimla (2000)
University College of Business Studies, Himachal Pradesh University, Shimla

Private university departments
 AP Goyal Shimla University, Shimla, District Shimla, HP
 Arni School of Technology, Arni University, Indora, District. Kangra (2009)
 Institute of Engineering and Emerging Technologies, Baddi University of Emerging Sciences and Technologies, Baddi (2002)
 School of Engineering & Technology, Bahra University, Waknaghat, Solan
 Chitkara School of Engineering and Technology, Chitkara University, Himachal Pradesh, Barotiwala, District. Solan (2008)
 Akal College of Engineering and Technology, Eternal University, Baru Sahib, Dist Sirmour (2007)
 Indus International University, una
 Faculty of Engineering and Technology, Shoolini University, Solan
 Sri Sai University, Palampur

Colleges affiliated to Himachal Pradesh Technical University
Atal Bihari Vajpayee Govt Institute of Engineering and Technology, Pragatinagar Shimla
Dev Bhumy Institute of Engineering & Technology, Chandpur, Una
Green Hills Engineering College, Kumarhatti (2003)
 Himachal Institute of Engineering, Paonta Sahib
 Himachal Institute of Engineering and Technology, Shahpur Kangra (2010)
 Himalayan Institute of Engineering and Technology, Kala Amb, Dist Sirmour (2009)
 IITT college of Engineering, Kala Amb (1997)
 Jawaharlal Nehru Government Engineering College, Sundernagar (2006)
 K.C. Institute of Engineering and Technology, District. Una (2009)
 L.R. Institute of Engineering & Technology, Solan-173223, Solan (2008)
 Mahant Ram Institute of Technology College of Engineering and Management, Bani, District. Hamirpur (2009)
 Rajiv Gandhi Government Engineering College Kangra
 SAI Ram Educational Trust Group of Institutions, Bullah Tipper, Dist Hamirpur (2009)
 Shiva Institute of Engineering and Technology, Bilaspur (2009)
 Sirda Institute of Engineering and Emerging Technology for Women, District. Mandi (2009)
 T. R. Abhilashi Memorial Institute of Engineering and Technology, Tanda, District. Mandi (2009)
 Vaishno College of Engineering, Kangra (2010)

Private Dental Colleges
 Bhojia Dental College & Hospital, Baddi, District. Solan
 Himachal Pradesh Dental College, Sunder, Nagar
 Himachal Institute of Dental Sciences, Poanta Sahib
 M.N.D.A.V. Dental College & Hospital, Solan

Govt Medical Colleges
 All India Institute of Medical Sciences Bilaspur (AIIMS Bilaspur). 
 Dr. Rajender Prasad Govt. Medical College, Kangra at Tanda
 Indira Gandhi Medical College and Hospital, Shimla
 Dr. Yashwant Singh Parmar Government Medical College, Nahan, Sirmaur H.P.
 Dr. Radhakrishnan Government Medical College (RGMC Hamirpur)

Private medical colleges
 Maharishi Markandeshwar Medical College & Hospital, Solan

Homoeopathic Colleges
 Solan Homoeopathic Medical College & Hospital, Kumarhatti, District. Solan www.solanhomoeocollege.in

Other Colleges
 Akal College of Nursing, Eternal University, Baru Sahib, District. Sirmour

Degree Colleges in Hamirpur Distt 
NSCBM GOVT COLLEGE HAMIRPUR, Anu , Hamirpur
 Govt College Nadaun Hamirpur
 Govt College Barsar Hamirpur
 Govt College Bhoranj Hamirpur
 Govt College Sujanpur Tira Hamirpur

Media colleges 
M S Panwar Institute of Communication and Management, Solan

Pharmacy colleges 
 Abhilashi Group of Institutions (School of Pharmacy), Chail Chowk, Tehsil Chachyot, District. Mandi, HP
 Baddi University of Emerging Sciences and Technologies, Baddi (2002)
 DDM College of Pharmacy, Gondpur Banehra (Upper), Tehsil Amb, District. Una (HP)
 Dreamz college of pharmacy, Village Khilra, PO Meramasit, Tehsil Sundernagar, District. Mandi (HP)
 Govt. B. Pharmacy College
 Govt. College of Pharmacy, Rohru, District. Shimla
 Himachal Institute of Pharmaceutical Education & Research (HIPER), VPO Bela, Tehsil Nadaun, District. Hamirpur (HP)
 Himalyan Institute of Pharmacy, near Suketi Fossil Park Road, Kala Amb, District. Sirmour (HP)
 Himachal Institute of Pharmacy, Rampur Ghat Road, Paonta sahib, District. Sirmour (HP)
 IEC School of Pharmacy, Baddi, Solan
 KC Institute of Pharmaceutical Sciences, VPO. Pandoga Uparla, District. Una. HP
 Laureate Institute of Pharmacy, VPO Kathog (Jawalaji), Tehsil Dehra, District. Kangra
 LR. Institute of Pharmacy, Vill. Jabli-Kyar, P.O. Ochghat, Sultanpur Road, District. Solan
 Sai Ram Education Trust's College of B. Pharmacy, VPO Tipper, Tehsil Barsar, District. Hamirpur 
 School of Pharmaceutical Sciences Shoolini University
 Vinyaka College of Pharmacy, Village Bohoguna, P.O. Garsa, District. Kullu (HP)
 GOVT. PHARMACY COLLEGE SERAJ, MANDI
  (OFF-CAMPUS) BAGSAID

Ayurveda colleges
 College of Ayurvedic Pharmaceutical Sciences, Jogindernagar, District. Mandi (HP
 Rajiv Gandhi Govt. Ayurvedic College Paprola, Kangra

Teachers' colleges 
 Government College of Teacher Education Dharamsala

Autonomous institutions 
 Himachal Pradesh National Law University, Shimla, Himachal Pradesh 
 Indian Institute of Management Sirmaur
 National Institute of Fashion Technology, Kangra

See also
 List of educational institutions in Shimla

References

External links
 List of state government universities in Himachal Pradesh

Himachal Pradesh
Education
Universities and colleges in Himachal Pradesh